Claire Dodd (born Dorothy Arlene Dodd; December 29, 1911 – November 23, 1973) was an American film actress.

Life and work
Dorothy Arlene Dodd was born on December 29, 1911, in Baxter, Iowa, to Walter Willard Dodd, a farmer whose family were early Jasper County pioneers, and his wife, Ethel Viola (née Cool) Dodd, daughter of Baxter Postmaster Peter J. Cool. Her parents married on June 28, 1911. The family moved frequently while she was growing up, living in Denver, Kansas City, Phoenix, St. Louis, and Missoula, Montana, among other places. Her parents separated in Montana. Young Dorothy went to California around 1927 where she worked as a model in Los Angeles and auditioned for minor film roles.

 

While working as a model in Los Angeles, she was cast in a small part in Eddie Cantor's movie Whoopee!, which was produced by Florenz Ziegfeld. Ziegfeld offered Dodd a part in his next Broadway musical, Smiles. She joined the Ziegfeld Follies and moved to New York City, where she studied singing and dancing. After Smiles ended, she signed a five-year contract with Paramount Pictures. After acting in bit parts in several films, she was signed to a Warner Bros. contract by Darryl F. Zanuck.

Some confusion has led to Dodd's birthplace being listed as Des Moines, Iowa. Early in her career, Dodd applied for a passport in preparation for a trip to Europe, and was reported as saying she only knew she was born in Iowa. Whether an attempted bit of publicity, she wound up with plenty in her home state. "My early childhood is just a blur to me," she once said. "I don't remember a thing about Iowa, I'm sorry to say. I was so small when I left there." Dodd had numerous relatives who still lived in and around Baxter when her apparent memory lapse was reported in the Register & Tribune's Iowa News Service on April 29, 1935. Locals were in an uproar for a time, spurred on by newspaper editorials taking the incident as an insult to a small town in rural Iowa. Deputy Jasper County Clerk John B. Norris quickly sent a copy of her birth certificate to Dodd by registered mail to end the question.

Dodd went on to work at Warner Brothers, Paramount and Universal studios in more than sixty films over a dozen years, from 1930-42. Dodd was usually type-cast as the "other woman", a femme fatale, siren, seductress, mistress, blackmailer, or other kind of schemer. But she also twice played secretary Della Street to Warren William's Perry Mason, in The Case of the Curious Bride (1935), and The Case of the Velvet Claws (1936). In the latter, Dodd's character was the only incarnation of Della Street to ever wed Mason. One of her last films was  Abbott and Costello's In the Navy (1941).

Family
Claire Dodd was Hollywood's "mystery girl" in the 1930s -- a label she acquired because she was good at keeping her personal and professional lives separate. In 1931, Dodd married John Milton Strauss, an investment banker. She gave birth to her first child, Jon Michael Strauss (born 1936), which surprised much of Hollywood society as they did not even know she was married. The couple divorced in 1938.

She retired from acting and married her second husband, H. Brand Cooper, in 1942. They had four children: a daughter (Austeene); and three sons (John T., Brand, and Peter).

Death
She died at her home in Beverly Hills, California, from cancer, aged 61. She is buried in the Brand Family Cemetery on the grounds of the Brand Library and Art Center in Glendale, California.

Partial filmography

 Our Blushing Brides (1930) as A Mannequin
 Whoopee! (1930) as Goldwyn Girl (uncredited)
 Up Pops the Devil (1931) as Minor Role (uncredited)
 The Lawyer's Secret (1931) as Party Guest (uncredited)
 Confessions of a Co-Ed (1931) as Co-Ed in Chapel (uncredited)
 The Secret Call (1931) as Maisie
 An American Tragedy (1931) as Gaile Warren (uncredited)
 The Road to Reno (1931) as Party Girl (uncredited)
 Girls About Town (1931) as Dot, Party Girl (uncredited)
 Working Girls (1931) as Jane
 Under Eighteen (1931) as Babsy
 Two Kinds of Women (1932) as Sheila Lavery (uncredited)
 Alias the Doctor (1932) as Mrs. Beverly (uncredited)
 The Broken Wing (1932) as Cecelia Cross
 This Is the Night (1932) as Chou-Chou (uncredited)
 Man Wanted (1932) as Ann Le Maire
 Guilty as Hell (1932) as Ruth Tindal
 The Crooner (1932) as Mrs. Constance Brown
 Lawyer Man (1932) as Virginia St. Johns
 The Match King (1932) as Ilse Wagner
 Parachute Jumper (1933) as Mrs. Newberry
 Hard to Handle (1933) as Marlene Reeves
 Blondie Johnson (1933) as Gladys LaMann
 Elmer, the Great (1933) as Evelyn Corey
 Ex-Lady (1933) as Iris Van Hugh
 Ann Carver's Profession (1933) as Carole Rodgers
 Footlight Parade (1933) as Vivian Rich
 My Woman (1933) as Muriel Bennett
 Massacre (1934) as Norma
 Gambling Lady (1934) as Sheila Aiken
 Journal of a Crime (1934) as Odette Florey
 Smarty (1934) as Anita
 The Personality Kid (1934) as Patricia Merrill
 I Sell Anything (1934) as Millicent
 Secret of the Chateau (1934) as Julie Verlaine
 Babbitt (1934) as Tanis Judique
 Roberta (1935) as Sophie Teale
 The Case of the Curious Bride (1935) as Della Street
 The Glass Key (1935) as Janet Henry
 Don't Bet on Blondes (1935) as Marilyn Youngblood
 The Goose and the Gander (1935) as Connie
 The Payoff (1935) as Maxine
 Two Against the World (1936) as Cora Latimer
 The Singing Kid (1936) as Dana Lawrence
 Navy Born (1936) as Bernice Farrington
 Murder by an Aristocrat (1936) as Janice Thatcher
 The Case of the Velvet Claws (1936) as Della Street
 The Women Men Marry (1937) as Claire Raeburn
 Romance in the Dark (1938) as Countess Monica Foldesay
 Fast Company (1938) as Julia Thorne
 Three Loves Has Nancy (1938) as Vivian Herford
 Charlie Chan in Honolulu (1938) as Mrs. Carol Wayne
 Woman Doctor (1939) as Gail Patterson
 Slightly Honorable (1939) as Alma Brehmer
 If I Had My Way (1940) as Brenda Johnson
 The Black Cat (1941) as Margaret Gordon
 In the Navy (1941) as Dorothy Roberts
 Don Winslow of the Navy (1942) as Mercedes Colby
 The Mad Doctor of Market Street (1942) as Patricia Wentworth
 Mississippi Gambler (1942) as Gladys La Verne
 Daring Young Man (1942) as Marlene (final film role)

References

Sources
 "When Dorothy forgot: 'There's no place like home'", Sunday Times-Republican Past Times, November 17, 1996, Marshalltown, Iowa.

External links

 
 
 

1911 births
1973 deaths
Actresses from Iowa
American film actresses
Deaths from cancer in California
People from Jasper County, Iowa
Ziegfeld girls
20th-century American actresses